The Hmar Students' Association (HSA), established in Imphal, Manipur, India, is a large student organisation among the indigenous Hmar people.

It was established on the 3rd of October 1939. Which is Celebrated as HSA Day. 

The organisation was outraged at the mass sexual assault of Hmar women in 2006, along with other groups, to facilitate justice. The organisation has also assisted relocating internally displaced people, and opposed a dam project.

See also
 List of Indian student organizations

References

External links
  (archived)

Students
Student organisations in India